Hippurarctia cinereoguttata is a moth of the  family Erebidae. It was described by Strand in 1912. It is found in Cameroon, Equatorial Guinea and Nigeria.

References

 Natural History Museum Lepidoptera generic names catalog

Syntomini
Moths described in 1912